José Manuel "El Moyo" Contreras (born 19 January 1986) is a Guatemalan professional footballer who plays as a midfielder for Liga Nacional club Comunicaciones.

Contreras has also played for clubs Arsenal de Sarandí in Argentina and C.D. Universidad de Concepción in Chile, among other clubs, and it’s known to be the promise of Guatemala soccer

Club career
Having begun his career at Municipal in the Guatemalan top division, Contreras briefly played in the Primera División (second level) with Deportivo Achuapa, and then returned to Comunicaciones where he played until July 2008, when he joined Arsenal de Sarandí. He made his debut for Arsenal on August 27, 2008 against Boca Juniors for the second leg of the Recopa Sudamericana, a match that ended 2–2 (3–5 aggregate in favor of Boca Juniors). Contreras came in at the beginning of the second half in substitution of Luciano Leguizamón, who left the pitch injured at the end of the first half.

In July 2009 it was rumored that Contreras would join Gimnasia de Jujuy of the Argentine 2nd division, but then a move to Uruguayan side CA Fénix at the end of August 2009 was announced. On 28 December 2009 he returned to Guatemala and signed with Xelajú MC.

In June 2010 Contreras rejoined the club where he started his career, Comunicaciones., playing there for the entirety of the 2010–2011 season; one year later, in June 2011, he was signed by C.D. Universidad de Concepción, and in August 2011 he made his debut scoring the third goal of his team's 3–0 win over Colo-Colo.

International career
Contreras' debut match for the Guatemala senior side was against Haiti in August 2006, where he made an assist to Mario Rodríguez in a 1–1 draw. He scored his first international goal in the match versus El Salvador in the 2007 CONCACAF Gold Cup.

In 2008, Contreras played for the U-23 national team of Guatemala in the qualification rounds to the 2008 Olympic tournament, where he led the team to a 1–0 victory against Haiti and an upsetting 2–1 victory against Mexico. The Guatemalan team ended the group stage in first place earning a semifinal berth against Honduras in which they came short of qualifying, losing 6–5 on penalty kicks. After his performances throughout the tournament, he was named one of the "eleven best" in the tournament alongside teammate Carlos Castrillo.

International goals
Scores and results list. Guatemala's goal tally first.

Honours
Comunicaciones
Liga Nacional de Guatemala: Clausura 2011, Apertura 2011, Clausura 2013, Apertura 2013, Clausura 2014, Apertura 2014, Clausura 2015, Clausura 2022
CONCACAF League: 2021

Antigua
Liga Nacional de Guatemala: Apertura 2017, Clausura 2019

References

External links
 Argentine Primera statistics at Fútbol XXI  

1986 births
Living people
People from Jutiapa Department
Guatemalan footballers
Guatemalan expatriate footballers
Guatemala international footballers
2007 UNCAF Nations Cup players
2007 CONCACAF Gold Cup players
2011 CONCACAF Gold Cup players
2013 Copa Centroamericana players
2014 Copa Centroamericana players
2015 CONCACAF Gold Cup players
Comunicaciones F.C. players
Arsenal de Sarandí footballers
Centro Atlético Fénix players
Universidad de Concepción footballers
Chilean Primera División players
Argentine Primera División players
Expatriate footballers in Chile
Expatriate footballers in Argentina
Expatriate footballers in Uruguay
Association football midfielders